Jiří Petrů (born 17 February 1985) is a Czech football defender currently playing for Vlašim.

References

External links
 
 
 Profile at Vlašim website 

1985 births
Living people
Sportspeople from Třebíč
Czech footballers
FK Viktoria Žižkov players
FC Sellier & Bellot Vlašim players
Association football defenders